Platybregmus is a genus of death-watch beetles in the family Ptinidae. There is at least one described species in Platybregmus, P. canadensis.

References

Further reading

 
 
 
 
 
 
 

Anobiinae